Ramsvika is a village in the municipality of Namsos in Trøndelag county, Norway.

References

Villages in Trøndelag
Namsos